The Scottish National League is an ice hockey league based in Scotland comprising 8 teams.

The league sits below the Elite Ice Hockey League (EIHL) in the UK ice hockey structure alongside England's National Ice Hockey League (NIHL).  

Following the demise of the British National League at the end of the 2004–05 season, the Fife Flyers and Dundee Stars transferred to the SNL, raising both the league's profile. Both teams have however since left the SNL and now compete in the highest tier of United Kingdom Ice Hockey, the Elite Ice Hockey League (EIHL).

Teams

2022-23 SNL Teams

Championships

References

External links
Scottish National League

1998 establishments in Scotland
2
Scot